Road routes in New South Wales assist drivers navigating roads in urban, rural, and scenic areas of the state.  Today, all numbered routes in the state are allocated a letter (M, A, B or D) in addition to a one- or -two digit number, with 'M' routes denoting motorways, 'A' routes denoting routes of national significance, 'B' routes denoting routes of state significance, and 'D' for Detour routes of a major motorway. The route system includes the officially designated highways, urban and intercity motorways and arterial roads, and important cross-state roads that have not been declared highways.

History 

Route numbers have been allocated to New South Wales' roads since 1954, with the introduction of National Routes across all states and territories in Australia, symbolised by a white shield with black writing; National Route 1 ('Highway 1') was one of the best-known numbered nation routes, likely due to its fame for circumnavigating the continent.

To supplement the National Route number system, three Ring Roads were introduced to Sydney in 1964, symbolised by a blue circular shield with white writing and a dotted outline. These lasted 10 years before their decommissioning in 1974.

In 1973, Freeway Routes were introduced to complement the state's National Routes and Sydney's Ring Roads, symbolised by blue rounded shields with white writing crowned by red crests as well, in an imitation of the American Interstate shield. Most of these routes were not signed as extensions opened, or were replaced with other routes in the years following, and while not officially decommissioned, virtually all signage of these routes were removed in 1992.

In 1974, the National Highway network was defined, which allowed some existing National Routes to be upgraded to National Highways. These were marked with the same shield design as the National Routes, except for their gold-on-green colouring and the word NATIONAL added across the top. The new State Routes system was also introduced in 1974, symbolised by blue rounded shields with white writing - much like the Freeway Routes, except without the red crests - and replaced Sydney's Ring Roads. Scores of other State Routes were designated across New South Wales, marking out urban arterial routes and secondary rural highways.

In 1992–1993, Sydney's Metroad system was introduced, symbolised by white hexagonal shields with blue writing, indicating Sydney's major radial and circumferential arteries. These routes subsumed many of the city's existing State Routes and also urban portions of National Routes and National Highways. A second, smaller allocation of Metroads were rolled out in 1998-9.

In 2013, the state replaced its entire system of National Routes, National Highways and Metroads with an alphanumeric route numbering system. Many existing numbered routes were allocated a letter (M, A, B or D) in addition to its number, with 'M' routes denoting motorways, 'A' routes denoting routes of national significance, 'B' routes denoting routes of state significance, and 'D' routes acting as motorway detours. Instead of shields, route numbers are displayed as yellow text on green rectangular backgrounds outlined in white, and has now - with the exception of Tourist Routes and a State Route or two - become the sole route numbering system in the state. The changeover to alphanumeric routes was announced in March 2013 and signs were updated between May and December 2013, either by removing old "shield" coverplates installed on newer signs, or installing new alphanumeric coverplates on old shielded signs, although some road projects (like Westlink M7 in 2005) or major highways (like Hume Highway from 1997) were allocated or converted to alphanumeric routes before the general change-over in 2013; these are noted. In 2020, the styling of the markers was modified to remove the white border, aligning with the design for all other states and territories except the ACT.

Alphanumeric Routes

M routes 
The Roads and Maritime Services define M routes as "motorway standard roads". In practice, this means roads allocated an M route are usually at least dual-carriageway motorways or high standard rural highways with at least two lanes in each direction. Unlike other states, New South Wales route allocations do not use a different background colour to designate a toll-road: routes attracting a toll are specifically marked.

A routes 
The Roads and Maritime Services define A routes as "routes of national significance". A routes are numbered between 1-49.

B routes 
The Roads and Maritime Services define B routes as "routes of state significance". B routes are numbered between 51-99, with the sole exception of Monaro Highway (allocated  to remain consistent across state lines).

D routes 
New South Wales is currently the only state in the country to use D routes, representing detour routes around nominated motorways (when closed or otherwise unusable). To date, there are only two D routes: D1 (routing around the M1 Pacific Motorway through the Central Coast), and D5 (routing around the M5 South-Western Motorway). After RMS standards changed, all signs now show "D", and there will be no more D routes in NSW.

Tourist Drives

Decommissioned Routes

See also 

 Highways in Australia for highways in other states and territories
 Highways in New South Wales for details about officially gazetted highways
 List of road routes in the Australian Capital Territory
 List of road routes in the Northern Territory
 List of road routes in Queensland
 List of road routes in South Australia
 List of road routes in Tasmania
 List of road routes in Victoria
 List of road routes in Western Australia

References 

 
 
New
Lists of buildings and structures in New South Wales
Road routes